Bandar Mahalleh (also Romanized as Bandar Maḩalleh) is a village in Otaqvar Rural District, Otaqvar District, Langarud County, Gilan Province, Iran. At the 2006 census, its population was 50, in 15 families.

References 

Populated places in Langarud County